Ride the Storm may refer to:

Ride the Storm (novel), a book by author Dean Koontz
"Ride the Storm" (song), a single by singer Simon Webbe from the film Fantastic Four: Rise of the Silver Surfer

See also
Ride Upon the Storm
Riders on the Storm